Ochropsora is a genus of fungi belonging to the family Uropyxidaceae.

The species of this genus are found in Eurasia and Northern America.

Species:

Ochropsora ariae 
Ochropsora daisenensis 
Ochropsora nambuana

References

Pucciniales
Basidiomycota genera